Mathias Maurice (1684 – 1 September 1738) was a Welsh minister and writer.

Career 
He initially joined Henllan Amgoed chapel before going to William Evans in Carmarthen to become a minister. In 1713, Mathias was briefly minister at Olney, before succeeding Richard Davis in Rothwell.

In 1726, Maurice wrote Byr a chywir Hanes Eglwys Rhydyceished yn eu Nheulltuad o Henllan, trwy y Blynyddoedd 1707, 1708, 1709, a short pamphlet on the history of Rhydyceished church, printed in 1727 in Maurice's book Y Wir Eglwys ('the true church'). This was answered by Jeremy Owen's pamphlet Golwg ar y Beiau (1732). Other writings by Mathias Maurice include Social Religion Exemplify'd (1759), Monuments of Mercy (1729) and A modern question affirmed and approved (1739). Social Religion Exemplify'd had seven editions published by 1860 was translated into Welsh by Evan Evans in 1862.

Personal life 
Mathias was born in Llanddewi-Velfrey, Pembrokeshire, the son of a tailor. He wife was Elisabeth Maurice. Mathis died in Rothwell in 1738. His widow lived up to age 73 and died on 8 October 1771.

See also 
Llyfryddiaeth y Cymry 1711, 1720, 1727, 1733, 1734, 1759

References 
 https://biography.wales/article/s-MAUR-MAT-1684

Specific

1684 births
1738 deaths
18th-century Welsh clergy